Heinz Lucke (born September 3, 1953) is a West German sprint canoer who competed in the mid-1970s. At the 1976 Summer Olympics in Montreal, he finished eighth in the C-2 1000 m event and ninth in the C-2 500 m event.

References

1953 births
Canoeists at the 1976 Summer Olympics
German male canoeists
Living people
Olympic canoeists of West Germany